The Grand Galvez Resort & Spa  is a historic 226-room resort hotel located in Galveston, Texas, United States that opened in 1911 as the Hotel Galvez. It was named to honor Bernardo de Gálvez, 1st Viscount of Galveston, for whom the city was named. The hotel was added to the National Register of Historic Places on April 4, 1979. It is a member of Historic Hotels of America, the official program of the National Trust for Historic Preservation.

History

Galveston civic leaders began plans to build the Hotel Galvez in 1898, after a fire destroyed another large hotel at the site, (the Beach Hotel). After the devastating Hurricane of 1900, which killed approximately 6,000 Galveston Island residents and leveled most of the buildings on the island, the plans accelerated, in order to draw tourists back to the island. The hotel occupies the site where the Beach Hotel, Electric Pavilion, and Pagoda Bathhouse once stood. The hotel was designed by Mauran, Russell & Crowell of St. Louis, Missouri, in a combination of Mission Revival and Spanish Revival styles and was constructed at a cost of $1 million. The Hotel Galvez opened in June 1911.

On October 3, 1940, the Hotel Galvez was acquired by William Lewis Moody, Jr. During World War II, the hotel was occupied by the United States Coast Guard for two years and rooms were not rented to tourists. The Hotel Galvez's importance to the local economy was restored after the war, particularly during the late 1940s and early 1950s when illegal gambling was popular in Galveston. When the Texas Rangers shut down the illegal gambling industry in the mid-1950s, the local economy became depressed and the Hotel Galvez deteriorated.

The hotel received a major refurbishing in 1965. In 1971, the hotel was acquired by Harvey O. McCarthey and Dr. Leon Bromberg. Denton Cooley purchased the hotel in 1978 and initiated another major renovation to the hotel in 1979. The Galvez became a Marriott franchise in 1989 and was renamed Marriott's Hotel Galvez. The hotel was purchased in April 1995 by Galveston native and real estate developer George P. Mitchell. Mitchell restored the hotel to its historic 1911 look. Mitchell Historic Properties, brought Wyndham Hotels & Resorts on to manage the hotel in 1996, as under the name Hotel Galvez, a Wyndham Historic Hotel. The name was later changed slightly to Hotel Galvez, a Wyndham Grand Hotel

During Hurricane Ike in 2008, the hotel lost clay tiles from its roof and was flooded on its lower level, where the spa, health club, business offices, and laundry were located.

In May 2021, the hotel was purchased by Seawall Hospitality LLC a Dallas-based hotel organization. It was renamed Grand Galvez Resort & Spa and management was transferred from Wyndham to Marriott's Autograph Collection division.

Famous guests
The Galvez was referred to as "The Playground of the Southwest" mostly for wealthy socialites, businessmen, and celebrities. American Presidents Franklin D. Roosevelt, Dwight D. Eisenhower, and Lyndon B. Johnson stayed at the Galvez, as did General Douglas MacArthur. Other notable names include Jimmy Stewart, Frank Sinatra, and Howard Hughes. Many of the 6th and 7th floor Junior and Senior suites are named for these famous and infamous personalities.

Gallery

See also

National Register of Historic Places listings in Galveston County, Texas
Recorded Texas Historic Landmarks in Galveston County
USS Flagship Hotel

References

External links

Grand Galvez Resort & Spa official website

Hotels in Texas
Hotel Galvez
Hotel Galvez
Hotel Galvez
Hotels established in 1911
Hotel buildings completed in 1911
Hotel buildings on the National Register of Historic Places in Texas
Recorded Texas Historic Landmarks